Apotactis citrophila is a species of moth in the family Gelechiidae. It was described by Edward Meyrick in 1933. It is found in Costa Rica.

References

Gelechiinae
Moths described in 1933
Moths of Central America
Taxa named by Edward Meyrick